Görlitzer Bahnhof is a Berlin U-Bahn station on the viaduct of lines U1 and U3.

It is located in Kreuzberg, in an area that offers a wide range of nightlife but is also notorious for its riots on 1 May 1987.

History

The station, designed by the Siemens & Halske company, opened on 18 February 1902 under the name of Oranienstraße and is still preserved in its original condition. In 1926, it was named after the nearby Görlitzer Bahnhof, one of Berlin's pre-war railway termini where southeastbound trains departed.

On 8 February 1945 the eastern parts of the section were completely destroyed. On 18 March 1945 there was heavy damage to the track area.
On 30 April 1951 Görlitzer Bahnhof was closed to passengers and in 1987 closed for freight. The name Görlitzer Bahnhof today is only used by the U-Bahn station.

In 1981, it was renovated.

References

External links

U1 (Berlin U-Bahn) stations
U3 (Berlin U-Bahn) stations
Railway stations in Germany opened in 1902
Buildings and structures in Friedrichshain-Kreuzberg